KRS Film Distributors is a Maltese film distributor company formed in 1946 under the name of Malta United Film Corporation.

Throughout its years of operation, over 10,000 film productions have been launched by the company in both Malta and Gozo, distributing product from more than forty countries.

History
In 1946, UK film trade association, Kinematograph Renter’s Society (now known as the Film Distributors' Association (FDA)), started to oversee film distribution in Malta. It set up Malta United Film Corporation to distribute films in Malta. Prior to its formation, Maltese exhibitors had to deal with UK distributors individually. In 1978, the company was renamed KRS Film Distributors and then KRS Releasing in 2014.

Cinemas in Maltese islands
In the 1950s, Malta had 48 commercial cinemas, 4 British military cinemas and 16 halls licensed to screen films. By 2019, there were just 6:
Citadel Cinema, Castle Hill, Victoria, Gozo
Eden Cinemas, St. Augustine Street, St. George's Bay, St. Julian's
Embassy Cinemas, Embassy Shopping Complex, St. Lucia Street, Valletta
Empire Cinema Complex, Pioneer Corps Road, Buġibba, St. Paul's Bay
St. James Cavalier Cinema, Castille Square, Valletta
Tal-Lira Cinema, Galleria Shopping and Entertainment Centre, Żabbar Road, Fgura

Box office
Box office data is not reported regularly, but totals for films are provided to the FDA annually for inclusion in UK box office totals.

Highest-grossing films in Malta
The highest-grossing films of all-time in Malta up to the end of 2018 were:

The highest-grossing film of 2006 was: Pirates of the Caribbean: Dead Man's Chest.

Cinema Days
KRS Releasing introduced two Children Cinema Days and a National Cinema Day with reduced prices to boost attendance.

In 2007, Children Cinema Day was orgnaised on 3 March 2007 in collaboration with all Maltese cinemas (apart from St James Cavalier Cinema).

The KRS' 2007 National Cinema Day was held on Saturday 7 July 2007. On this day films showed for the public at the reduced price of Lm1.30c (€3.03c) per person with the screenings starting at 9.30 a.m. and finished until late at night. KRS Film Distributors lined up 17 films for the occasion, including three new films.

The second Children Cinema Day for 2007 organised by KRS was celebrated on Saturday, 1 September 2007, including one film that was not previewed before this day, the animated film Happily N'Ever After.

Top 10 KRS film releases in 2007

40th week of 2007
No Reservations (Warner Bros.)
Antonement (Universal Pictures)
Rush Hour 3 (New Line Cinema)
License to Wed (Warner Bros.)
The Bourne Ultimatum (Universal)
1408 (Paramount)
Hairspray (New Line Cinema)
Shoot 'Em Up (New Line Cinema)
Knocked Up (Universal)
Disturbia (Paramount)

Other films in Maltese cinemas were: Evan Almighty, Lucky You, Goya's Ghosts, The Hitcher, Amazing Grace, The Squid and the Whale, The Brave One, Superbad, Die Hard 4.0, Happily N'Ever After, Harry Potter and the Order of the Phoenix, A Mighty Heart, Shrek the Third, La Vie En Rose, Transformers, Hot Rod.

39th week of 2007

38th week of 2007
Rush Hour 3 (Entertainment)
The Bourne Ultimatum (Universal)
Knocked Up (Universal)
License to Wed (Warner Bros.)
Evan Almighty (Universal)
Disturbia (Paramount)
1408 (Paramount)
Breach (20th Century Fox)
Shrek the Third (Paramount)
Are We Done Yet? (Sony Pictures Entertainment)

Other films in Maltese cinemas were: The Painted Veil, The Messengers, No Reservations, A Mighty Heart, Wedding Daze, Transformers, Bratz: The Movie, Surf's Up, Harry Potter and the Order of the Phoenix, Firehouse Dog, The Reaping, The Namesake, The US vs John Lennon, Hostel Part II, Romanzo Criminale, Die Hard 4.0

37th week of 2007
Rush Hour 3 (Entertainment)
The Bourne Ultimatum (Universal)
Knocked Up (Universal)
License to Wed (Warner Bros.)
Evan Almighty (Universal)
Shrek the Third (Paramount)
1408 (Paramount)
Transformers (Paramount)
Are We Done Yet? (Sony Pictures Entertainment)
Surf's Up (Sony Pictures Entertainment)

Other films in the Maltese cinemas were: Breach, Disturbia, Goodbye Bafana, Firehouse Dog, Hairspray, Fantastic Four: Rise of the Silver Surfer, The Hitcher, Harry Potter and the Order of the Phoenix, The Simpsons Movie, Hostel Part II, Private, Die Hard 4.0, Bratz: The Movie, Letters from Iwo Jima, The Illusionist, The Breed

36th week of 2007
Rush Hour 3 (Entertainment)
The Bourne Ultimatum (Universal)
Evan Almighty (Universal)
Shrek the Third (Paramount)
Surf's Up (Sony Pictures Entertainment)
Transformers (Paramount)
Fantastic Four: Rise of the Silver Surfer (Warner Bros.)
Harry Potter and the Order of the Phoenix (Warner Bros.)
The Simpsons Movie (20th Century Fox)
License to Wed (Warner Bros.)

Other films in the Maltese cinemas were: The Painted Veil, Next, Die Hard 4.0, Are We Done Yet?, Pirates of the Caribbean: At World's End, Vacancy, Happily N'Ever After, Knocked Up, Paradise Lost, Paradise Now, The Hidden Blade, 1408, The Messengers, Hostel Part II, Lady Vengeance, Grow Your Own, Hairspray

35th week of 2007
Rush Hour 3 (Entertainment)
Evan Almighty (Universal)
Transformers (Paramount)
The Simpsons Movie (20th Century Fox)
Harry Potter and the Order of the Phoenix (Warner Bros.)
Shrek the Third (Paramount)
Ocean's 13 (Warner Bros.)
Surf's Up (Sony Pictures Entertainment)
Hostel Part II (Sony Pictures Entertainment)
Pirates of the Caribbean: At World's End (Buena Vista)

Other films in Maltese cinemas were: The Bourne Ultimatum, Happily N'ever After, Goya's Ghosts, The Messengers, Torremolinos 73, Die Hard 4.0, License to Wed, Hairspray, Are We Done Yet?, Fantastic Four: Rise of the Silver Surfer, The Reef, The Return, Paradise Now.

34th week of 2007
Evan Almighty (Universal)
Transformers (Paramount)
The Simpsons Movie (20th Century Fox)
Harry Potter and the Order of the Phoenix (Warner Bros.)
Shrek the Third (Paramount)
Pirates of the Caribbean: At World's End (Buena Vista)
Surf's Up (Sony Pictures Entertainment)
Die Hard 4.0 (20th Century Fox)
Hairspray (Entertainment)
Firehouse Dog (20th Century Fox)

Other films in Maltese cinemas were: Rush Hour 3, Goodbye Bafana, Goya's Ghosts, Ocean's Thirteen, Pathfinder, Black Snake Moan, Hostel 2, Tickets, The Messengers, Lucky You, Paradise Lost, The Good Shepherd, Good Night, and Good Luck.

33rd week of 2007
The data was not written by any Wikipedia user.

32nd week of 2007
Transformers (Paramount)
The Simpsons Movie (20th Century Fox)
Harry Potter and the Order of the Phoenix (Warner Bros.)
Shrek the Third (Paramount)
Hairspray (Entertainment)
Die Hard 4.0 (20th Century Fox)
Spider-Man 3 (Sony Pictures Entertainment)
The Hitcher (Universal)
Are We Done Yet? (Sony Pictures Entertainment)
Fantastic Four: Rise of the Silver Surfer (20th Century Fox)

Other films in Maltese cinemas were: Ushpizin, L'Enfer, The Reaping, Pathfinder, Pirates of the Caribbean: At World's End, Mr. Bean's Holiday, Next, Firehouse Dog, Goodbye Bafana, The Messengers, Ocean's Thirteen, Goya's Ghosts, Paradise Lost.

31st week of 2007
Harry Potter and the Order of the Phoenix (Warner Bros.)
The Simpsons Movie (20th Century Fox)
Shrek the Third (Paramount)
Die Hard 4.0 (20th Century Fox)
Hairspray (Entertainment)
Transformers (Paramount)
Fantastic Four: Rise of the Silver Surfer (20th Century Fox)
Spider-Man 3 (Sony Pictures Entertainment)
Are We Done Yet? (Sony Pictures Entertainment)
Mr. Bean's Holiday (Universal)

Other films in Maltese cinemas were: Zodiac, Next, Black Snake Moan, Perfume, Ushpizin, The Hitcher, Goya's Ghosts, Pirates of the Caribbean: At World's End, The Painted Veil, The Messengers, Ocean's Thirteen, Vacancy, Wedding Daze.

30th week of 2007
Harry Potter and the Order of the Phoenix (Warner Bros.)
Shrek the Third (Paramount)
Die Hard 4.0 (20th Century Fox)
Are We Done Yet? (Sony Pictures Entertainment)
Fantastic Four: Rise of the Silver Surfer (20th Century Fox)
Pirates of the Caribbean: At World's End (Buena Vista)
Mr. Bean's Holiday (Universal)
Wedding Daze (Pathé)
Ocean's Thirteen (Warner Bros.)
The Painted Veil (Momentum)

Other films in Maltese cinemas were: Fracture, Spider-Man 3, Premonition, Hairspray, The Simpsons Movie, Notes on a Scandal, Bobby, Vacancy, Secuestro Express, The Messengers, Magicians, Bridge to Terabithia, Shooter.

29th week of 2007
Harry Potter and the Order of the Phoenix (Warner Bros.)
Shrek the Third (Paramount)
Fantastic Four: Rise of the Silver Surfer (20th Century Fox)
Are We Done Yet? (Sony Pictures Entertainment)
Mr. Bean's Holiday (Universal)
Ocean's Thirteen (Warner Bros.)
Pirates of the Caribbean: At World's End (Buena Vista)
Spider-Man 3 (Sony Pictures Entertainment)
The Painted Veil (Momentum)
28 Weeks Later (20th Century Fox)

Other films in Maltese cinemas were: Die Hard 4.0, The Illusionist, Vacancy, Shooter, The Reef, Wedding Daze, Miss Potter, Babel, Becoming Jane, The Messengers, Fracture

28th week of 2007
Shrek the Third (Paramount)
Fantastic Four: Rise of the Silver Surfer (20th Century Fox)
Pirates of the Caribbean: At World's End (Buena Vista)
Are We Done Yet? (Sony Pictures Entertainment)
Spider-Man 3 (Sony Pictures Entertainment)
Ocean's Thirteen (Warner Bros.)
Mr. Bean's Holiday (Universal)
28 Weeks Later (20th Century Fox)
Next (Entertainment)
Zodiac (Warner Bros.)

Other films in Maltese cinemas were: Harry Potter and the Order of the Phoenix, Bridge to Terabithia, Catch a Fire, The Last King of Scotland, Blood Diamond, The Painted Veil, The Messengers, Tsotsi, The Breed, Fracture

27th week of 2007
Shrek the Third (Paramount)
Fantastic Four: Rise of the Silver Surfer (20th Century Fox)
Pirates of the Caribbean: At World's End (Buena Vista)
Ocean's Thirteen (Warner Bros.)
Next (Entertainment)
Spider-Man 3 (Sony Pictures Entertainment)
Zodiac (Warner Bros.)
Fracture (Entertainment)
Perfect Stranger (Sony Pictures Entertainment)
Black Snake Moan (Paramount)

Other films in Maltese cinemas were: Black, Pather Panchali, Are We Done Yet?, Shooter, Mr. Bean's Holiday, The Edukators, 28 Weeks Later, The Messengers, Epic Movie, Spy Kids 3D, The Illusionist

26th week of 2007
Fantastic Four: Rise of the Silver Surfer (20th Century Fox)
Pirates of the Caribbean: At World's End (Buena Vista)
Ocean's Thirteen (Warner Bros.)
Spider-Man 3 (Sony Pictures Entertainment)
Next (Entertainment)
Zodiac (Warner Bros.)
Fracture (Entertainment)
Perfect Stranger (Sony Pictures Entertainment)
The Reef (Warner Bros.)
Pathfinder (20th Century Fox)

Other films in Maltese cinemas were: Shrek the Third, The Illusionist, The Last Mimzy, First Daughter, Hannibal Rising, Wild Hogs, Black Snake Moan, Shooter, The Reaping, Mr. Bean's Holiday, The Messengers

25th week of 2007
Fantastic Four: Rise of the Silver Surfer (20th Century Fox)
Pirates of the Caribbean: At World's End (Buena Vista)
Ocean's Thirteen (Warner Bros.)
Spider-Man 3 (Sony Pictures Entertainment)
Next (Entertainment)
Zodiac (Warner Bros.)
Fracture (Entertainment)
Perfect Stranger (Sony Pictures Entertainment)
The Reef (Warner Bros.)
Pathfinder (20th Century Fox)

Other films in Maltese cinemas were: Mr. Bean's Holiday, Bridge to Terabithia, Shooter, The Reaping, A Cock and Bull Story, The Squid and the Whale, Machuca, Wild Hogs

24th week of 2007
Pirates of the Caribbean: At World's End (Buena Vista)
Ocean's Thirteen (Warner Bros.)
Spider-Man 3 (Sony Pictures Entertainment)
Fracture (Entertainment)
Mr Bean's Holiday (Universal)
Norbit (Paramount)
The Reef (Warner Bros.)
300 (Warner Bros.)
Perfect Stranger (Sony Pictures Entertainment)
Alpha Dog (Icon)

Other films in Maltese cinemas were: The Notorious Bettie Page, A Cock and Bull Story, Next, Premonition, Bridge to Terabithia, Shooter, The Reaping, The Namesake, The Good German, Pathfinder, Meet the Robinsons, Wild Hogs, The Adventures of Shark Boy and Lava Girl in 3D

23rd week of 2007
Pirates of the Caribbean: At World's End (Buena Vista)
Spider-Man 3 (Sony Pictures Entertainment)
Fracture (Entertainment)
Mr Bean's Holiday (Universal)
Norbit (Paramount)
Bridge to Terabithia (Icon)
Premonition (Entertainment)
Perfect Stranger (Sony Pictures Entertainment)
Shooter (Paramount)
Wild Hogs (Buena Vista)

Other films in Maltese cinemas were: The Illusionist, Reno 911! Miami, Evil, The Reaping, Alpha Dog, The Reef, Ocean's Thirteen, Teenage Mutant Ninja Turtles, The Hills Have Eyes 2, 300, Stomp the Yard, A Cock and Bull Story

22nd week of 2007
Pirates of the Caribbean: At World's End (Buena Vista)
Spider-Man 3 (Sony Pictures Entertainment)
Mr Bean's Holiday (Universal)
Premonition (Entertainment)
Perfect Stranger (Sony Pictures Entertainment)
Bridge to Terabithia (Icon)
Shooter (Paramount)
Ghost Rider (Sony Pictures Entertainment)
Catch a Fire {Universal}
300 (Warner Bros.)

Other films in Maltese cinemas were: District 13, The Big White, Outlaw, Hannibal Rising, Norbit, Babel, Hot Fuzz, Fracture, Reno 911! Miami, Letters from Iwo Jima, The Illusionist, The U.S. vs. John Lennon, Wild Hogs, The Reaping, Amazing Grace

21st week of 2007
Spider-Man 3 (Sony Pictures Entertainment)
Bridge to Terabithia (Icon)
Mr Bean's Holiday (Universal)
Premonition (Entertainment)
Shooter (Paramount)
Perfect Stranger (Sony Pictures Entertainment)
I Want Candy (Buena Vista)
Wild Hogs (Buena Vista)
300 (Warner Bros.)
The Last Mimzy (Entertainment)

Other films in Maltese cinemas were: Catch a Fire, Pirates of the Caribbean: At World's End, Ghost Rider, Dream Girls, Fantastic Four, The Number 23, Freedom Writers, Little Children, Stranger than Fiction, The Illusionist, The Hills Have Eyes 2, Norbit, Amazing Grace

20th week of 2007
Spider-Man 3 (Sony Pictures Entertainment)
Mr Bean's Holiday (Universal)
Premonition (Entertainment)
Shooter (Paramount)
Wild Hogs (Buena Vista)
Perfect Stranger (Sony Pictures Entertainment)
The Last Mimzy (Entertainment)
300 (Warner Bros.)
Norbit (Paramount)
Epic Movie (20th Century Fox)

Other films in Maltese cinemas were: Bridge to Terabithia, I Want Candy, The Illusionist, Science of Sleep, The Hills Have Eyes 2, Reign Over Me, Arthur and the Invisibles, Gridiron Gang, Ghost Rider, Teenage Mutant Ninja Turtles, Shooting Dogs, Gaġġa, The Last King of Scotland, Grounded, Music and Lyrics, The Number 23

19th week of 2007
Spider-Man 3 (Sony Pictures Entertainment)
Mr Bean's Holiday (Universal)
300 (Warner Bros.)
Wild Hogs (Buena Vista)
Perfect Stranger (Sony Pictures Entertainment)
Norbit (Paramount)
Qerq (Bronk Productions)
Becoming Jane (Buena Vista)
The Hills Have Eyes 2 (20th Century Fox)
The Illusionist (Momentum)
Epic Movie (20th Century Fox)

Other films in Maltese cinemas were: Notes on a Scandal, It's a Boy Girl Thing, The Last Mimzy, Shooter, Hot Fuzz, Meet the Robinsons, Music and Lyrics, Children of Men, Premonition, Gaġġa, Shooting Dogs, Hannibal Rising, Ghost Rider, Letters from Iwo Jima

18th week of 2007
Mr Bean's Holiday (Universal)
300 (Warner Bros.)
Wild Hogs (Buena Vista)
Perfect Stranger (Sony Pictures Entertainment)
Norbit (Paramount)
Qerq (Bronk Productions)
Becoming Jane (Buena Vista)
Epic Movie (20th Century Fox)
Ghost Rider (Sony Pictures Entertainment)
Hannibal Rising (Momentum)

Other films in Maltese cinemas were: Catch and Release, Spider-Man 3, Grounded, Blood Diamond, Zoom, The Good Shepherd, The Hills Have Eyes 2, Music and Lyrics, The Number 23, The Hidden Blade, The Illusionist

17th week of 2007
Mr Bean's Holiday (Universal)
300 (Warner Bros.)
Perfect Stranger (Sony Pictures Entertainment)
Norbit (Paramount)
Qerq (Bronk Productions)
Epic Movie (20th Century Fox)
Goal! 2: Living the Dream... (Buena Vista)
Ghost Rider (Sony Pictures Entertainment)
Hannibal Rising (Momentum)
The Illusionist (Momentum)

Other films in Maltese cinemas were: Blood Diamond, Arthur and the Invisibles, Becoming Jane, Wild Hogs, Because I Said So, Teenage Mutant Ninja Turtles, Employee of the Month, Music and Lyrics, The Number 23, Blades of Glory, Stomp the Yard, Sunshine, Miss Potter, Babel, Apocalypto, Hollywoodland

16th week of 2007
Mr Bean's Holiday (Universal)
300 (Warner Bros.)
Norbit (Paramount)
Qerq (Bronk Productions)
Ghost Rider (Sony Pictures Entertainment)
Night at the Museum (20th Century Fox)
Sunshine (20th Century Fox)
Teenage Mutant Ninja Turtles (Warner Bros.)
Charlotte's Web (Paramount)
Notes on a Scandal (20th Century Fox)

Other films in Maltese cinemas were: Perfect Stranger, Employee of the Month, Hannibal Rising, Paradise Now, Epic Movie, The Illusionist, Because I Said So, Babel, Music and Lyrics, The Good Shepherd, The Number 23, Blood Diamond, Dreamgirls, White Noise: The Light, Perfume, Goal! 2: Living the Dream...

15th week of 2007
Mr Bean's Holiday (Universal)
Norbit (Paramount)
Ghost Rider (Sony Pictures Entertainment)
Qerq (Bronk Productions)
300 (Warner Bros.)
Night at the Museum (20th Century Fox)
Notes on a Scandal (20th Century Fox)
Teenage Mutant Ninja Turtles (Warner Bros.)
Blood Diamond (Warner Bros.)
The Number 23 (Entertainment)

Other films in Maltese cinemas were: Music and Lyrics, The Good Shepherd, The Last King of Scotland, Dreamgirls, Charlotte's Web, All the King's Men, Flags of Our Fathers, Sunshine, Hot Fuzz, Because I Said So, Babel, The Sun, Epic Movie, The Outlaw

14th week of 2007
Norbit (Paramount)
Ghost Rider (Sony Pictures Entertainment)
Notes on a Scandal (20th Century Fox)
Hot Fuzz (Universal)
Meet the Robinsons (Buena Vista Entertainment)
Blood Diamond (Warner Bros.)
Babel (Paramount)
The Number 23 (Entertainment)
Goal! 2: Living the Dream... (Buena Vista Entertainment)
It's a Boy Girl Thing (Icon)

Other films in Maltese cinemas were: Mr Bean's Holiday, Teenage Mutant Ninja Turtles, Blood and Chocolate, Dreamgirls, The Good Shepherd, Bobby, Music and Lyrics, Because I Said So, Charlotte's Web, Qerq, Night at the Museum, Chicken Little, The Pursuit of Happyness

13th week of 2007
Norbit (Paramount)
Ghost Rider (Sony Pictures Entertainment
The Number 23 (Entertainment)
Blood Diamond (Warner Bros.)
Qerq (Bronk Productions)
Notes on a Scandal (20th Century Fox)
Happy Feet (Warner Bros.
Rocky Balboa (20th Century Fox)
Miss Potter (Momentum)
It's a Boy Girl Thing (Icon)

Other film in Maltese cinemas were: Meet the Robinsons, Hot Fuzz, The Pursuit of Happyness, Casino Royale, Perfume, Goal! 2: Living the Dream..., Smokin' Aces, Babel, Freedom Writers, Blood and Chocolate, The Good Shepherd, Arthur and the Invisibles, Gridiron Gang, Music and Lyrics, Dreamgirls

12th week of 2007
Norbit (Paramount)
The Number 23 (Entertainment)
Qerq (Bronk Productions)
Blood Diamond (Warner Bros.)
Music and Lyrics (Warner Bros.)
The Good Shepherd (Universal)
Babel (Paramount)
Dreamgirls (Paramount)
Déjà Vu (Buena Vista Entertainment)
Arthur and the Invisibles (Momentum)

Other films in Maltese cinemas were: Rocky Balboa, Happy Feet, Ghost Rider, Venus, Miss Potter, Borat, The Prestige, Il-Gaġġa, Notes on a Scandal, It's a Boy Girl Thing, Goal! 2: Living the Dream..., An Inconvenient Truth, Blood and Chocolate, Shooting Dogs, The Last King of Scotland

11th week of 2007
The Number 23 (Entertainment)
Qerq (Bronk Productions)
Blood Diamond (Warner Bros.)
Music and Lyrics (Warner Bros.)
Babel (Paramount)
The Good Shepherd (Universal)
Goal! 2: Living the Dream... (Buena Vista Entertainment)
Dreamgirls (Paramount)
Grounded (Warner Bros.)
The Holiday (UIP)

Other films in Maltese cinemas were: Charlotte's Web, Borat, Norbit, Déjà Vu, Curious George, Things To Do Before You're 30, Arthur and the Invisibles, The Last Mitterrand, A Good Year, Il-Gaġġa, Night at the Museum, Perfume, Miss Potter, Running with Scissors, An Inconvenient Truth, It's a Boy Girl Thing

10th week of 2007
Qerq (Bronk Productions)
Goal! 2: Living the Dream... (Buena Vista Entertainment)
Night at the Museum (20th Century Fox)
Charlotte's Web (Paramount)
Happy Feet (Warner Bros.)
Blood Diamond (Warner Bros.)
Music and Lyrics (Warner Bros.)
The Good Shepherd (Universal)
Babel (Paramount)
Grounded (Warner Bros.)

Other films in Maltese cinemas were: Rocky Balboa, Dreamgirls, The Number 23, The Holiday, Chicken Run, Eragon, Apocalypto, A Good Year, The Last Mitterrand, Il-Gaġġa, Miss Potter, Perfume, An Inconvenient Truth, The Last King of Scotland, School For Scoundrels, The Pursuit of Happyness

9th week of 2007
Qerq (Bronk Productions)
Blood Diamond (Warner Bros.)
Goal! 2: Living the Dream... (Buena Vista Entertainment)
Music and Lyrics (Warner Bros.)
Night at the Museum (20th Century Fox)
Perfume (Pathé)
Charlotte's Web (Paramount)
The Pursuit of Happyness (Sony Pictures Releasing)
Little Man (Sony Pictures Releasing)
Rocky Balboa (20th Century Fox)

Other films in Maltese cinemas were: Babel, The Good Shepherd, Happy Feet, Déjà Vu, White Noise: The Light, Grounded, Casino Royale, An Inconvenient Truth, The Last King of Scotland, Beneath Her Window, The Last Mitterrand, Smokin' Aces, Eragon, Over the Hedge, John Tucker Must Die

8th week of 2007
Qerq (Bronk Productions)
Blood Diamond (Warner Bros.)
Goal! 2: Living the Dream... (Buena Vista Entertainment)
Charlotte's Web (Paramount)
The Pursuit of Happyness (Sony Pictures Releasing)
Perfume (Pathé)
Night at the Museum (20th Century Fox)
Rocky Balboa (20th Century Fox)
Step Up (UIP)
White Noise: The Light (Entertainment)

Other films in Maltese cinemas were: Music and Lyrics, Little Man, Monster House, DOA: Dead or Alive, Apocalypto, The Queen, The Departed, Casino Royale, The Big White, The Holiday, The Return, Good Night, and Good Luck, Déjà Vu, The Last King of Scotland

7th week of 2007
Qerq (Bronk Productions)
Blood Diamond (Warner Bros.)
Rocky Balboa (20th Century Fox)
Night at the Museum (20th Century Fox)
The Pursuit of Happyness (Sony Pictures Releasing)
Charlotte's Web (Paramount)
Smokin' Aces (Universal)
Just My Luck (20th Century Fox)
Déjà Vu (Buena Vista Entertainment)
The Last King of Scotland (20th Century Fox)

Other films in Maltese cinemas were: Walk on Water, Little Children, Garfield 2, Step Up, Flushed Away, Fearless, Perfume, Goal! 2: Living the Dream..., Borat, White Noise: The Light, Happy Feet, Stranger than Fiction, Zoom, Apocalypto, Hell, The Holiday, Casino Royale, Volver, Little Miss Sunshine

6th week of 2007
Qerq (Bronk Productions)
Rocky Balboa (20th Century Fox)
The Pursuit of Happyness (Sony Pictures Releasing)
Night at the Museum (20th Century Fox)
Smokin' Aces (Universal)
Déjà Vu (Buena Vista Entertainment)
Apocalypto (Icon Entertainment)
The Last King of Scotland (20th Century Fox)
Blood Diamond (Warner Bros.)
Casino Royale (Sony Pictures Releasing)

Other films in Maltese cinemas were: The Ant Bully, Crank, Just My Luck, Snakes on a Plane, The Devil Wears Prada, Thank You for Smoking, The Last Kiss, Marie Antoinette, Charlotte's Web, Happy Feet, The Prestige, Saw III, The Notorious Bettie Page, Zoom, Stranger than Fiction, The Holiday

5th week of 2007
Rocky Balboa (20th Century Fox)
The Pursuit of Happyness (Sony Pictures Releasing)
Night at the Museum (20th Century Fox)
Apocalypto (Icon Entertainment)
Déjà Vu (Buena Vista Entertainment)
Happy Feet (Warner Bros.)
Casino Royale (Sony Pictures Releasing)
Stranger than Fiction (Sony Pictures Releasing)
Eragon (20th Century Fox)
Saw III (Lions Gate Entertainment)

Other films in Maltese cinemas were: The Departed, Little Children, Flags of Our Fathers, Open Season, Click, Just My Luck, The Break-Up, Qerq, Smokin' Aces, The Last King of Scotland, Borat, The Prestigue, and The Holiday

4th week of 2007
The Pursuit of Happyness (Sony Pictures Releasing)
Apocalypto (Icon Entertainment)
Night at the Museum (20th Century Fox)
Déjà Vu (Buena Vista Entertainment)
Casino Royale (Sony Pictures Releasing)
Happy Feet (Warner Bros.)
Saw III (Lions Gate Entertainment)
The Covenant (Sony Pictures Releasing)
The Holiday (United International Pictures)
The Prestige (Warner Bros.)

Other films in Maltese cinemas were: The Sentinel, Click, Ice Age: The Meltdown, A Good Year, Rocky Balboa, Flushed Away, Stranger than Fiction, Step Up, Eragon, The Night Listener, Revolver, The Wind That Shakes the Barley, Borat, Flags of Our Fathers, Tenacious D in The Pick of Destiny, Shooting Dogs.

3rd week of 2007
Night at the Museum (20th Century Fox)
Apocalypto (Icon Entertainment)
Déjà Vu (Buena Vista Pictures)
Saw III (Lions Gate Entertainment)
Casino Royale (Sony Pictures Releasing)
Eragon (20th Century Fox)
Flags of Our Fathers (Warner Bros.)
The Holiday (United International Pictures) 
Marie Antoinette (Sony Pictures Entertainment)
Borat: Cultural Learnings of America for Make Benefit Glorious Nation of Kazakhstan (20th Century Fox)

Other films in Maltese cinemas were: The Sentinel, Click, A Good Year, The Covenant, The Pursuit of Happyness, Happy Feet, Crank, The Prestige, Short Cuts, Dirty Deeds, Danny Deckchair, Flushed Away, Volver, Tenacious D in The Pick of Destiny and District 13.

2nd week of 2007
Night at the Museum (20th Century Fox)
Happy Feet (Warner Bros.)
Déjà Vu (Buena Vista Pictures)
Eragon (20th Century Fox)
Casino Royale (Sony Pictures Releasing)
Saw III (Lions Gate Entertainment)
Flushed Away (United International Pictures)
Deck The Halls (20th Century Fox)
The Holiday (United International Pictures)
Marie Antoinette (Sony Pictures Entertainment)

Other films in Maltese cinemas were: Whisky, The Black Dahlia, Little Man, Children of Men, Apocalypto, Flags of Our Fathers, Big Nothing, The Last Kiss, Borat, Little Children, The Prestige, Volver and Hollywoodland.

1st week of 2007
Night at the Museum (20th Century Fox)
Happy Feet (Warner Bros.)
Eragon (20th Century Fox)
Casino Royale (Sony Pictures Releasing)
Déjà Vu (Buena Vista Pictures)
Deck The Halls (20th Century Fox)
The Nativity Story (New Line Cinema)
Flushed Away (United International Pictures)
The Holiday (United International Pictures)
The Santa Clause 3: The Escape Clause (Buena Vista Pictures)

Other films in Maltese cinemas were: The Beat That My Heart Skipped, Friends with Money, A Good Year, Click, Starter for 10, The Last Kiss, Marie Antoinette, Borat, Saw III, Step Up, The Prestige, Flags of Our Fathers and Little Children.

References

External links

Film distributors
Mass media in Malta
Entertainment rating organizations
Mass media companies established in 1946
1946 establishments in Malta